Nordic Capital private equity funds focus on investments primarily in Northern Europe.  Nordic Capital invests in selective industries with a particular focus on Healthcare, Tech & Payments and Financial Services. In addition selective investments are made in Industrial & Business Services.

Since inception in 1989, Nordic Capital has invested more than EUR 21 billion in over 125 companies. 

Nordic Capital invest to build sustainable businesses through operational improvement and transformative growth. The investment philosophy is based on growth acceleration, business transformation and to partner closely with management teams to support positive change at the company level during the ownership period. 

Nordic Capital has a large number of institutional investors, including public and private pension funds, sovereign wealth funds, financial institutions, endowments and family offices, and other institutional investors.

The Nordic Capital Funds are advised by advisory entities, which are based in Sweden, Denmark, Finland, Norway, Germany, UK, US and South-Korea. In total, over 200 people are employed by Nordic Capital.

Investments 
The following companies can be found among Nordic Capital's former investments:

Ellos Group, leading e-commerce company within the Nordic region based in Borås, Sweden. Acquired in 2013 and divested via trade sale in 2019 for SEK2.4bn (c. €229m).
Luvata Group, Finnish metal manufacturing company, acquired from Outokumpu Oyj in 2005 and exited through sale of individual business units between 2016 and 2017.
Bambora, payment solution and services. Built on a platform acquired in 2014, and divested 2017 through a sale to Ingenico.
Capio, healthcare services, acquired in 2006, listed in 2015, final holding divested in 2017.
 Thule, leisure outdoor industry. Acquired in 2007, listed in 2014, final holding divested in 2016. 
 Permobil, powered wheelchair manufacturer. Acquired in 2006 and divested in 2013 to Investor. 
Nycomed, pharmaceuticals producer. Owned between 1999 and  2002. Acquired again in 2005 and sold in 2011 to Takeda in the biggest private equity sale in Europe to date.
Mölnlycke Health Care, surgical products manufacturer. Acquired in 1997 and divested in 2005 to Investor.
 Fritidsresor, tour operator. Acquired in 1995 and divested in 1998 through a sale to Thomson Travel Group.
Anticimex, pest control services. Owned between 1992 and 1995 and acquired again in 2001. Divested in 2006.
Itiviti, Financial Technology and Services, formed in 2016 by the union of Orc Group and CameronTec and merged with Ullink in 2017. Acquired in 2012 (Orc Group) and 2018 (Itiviti).
ProGlove, IoT device developer and manufacturer, formed in 2014 and acquired in May 2022. Estimated €500m acquisition.

References

External links
Nordic Capital (company website)

Financial services companies established in 1989
Private equity companies of Jersey